Louis Richard Mahrt (July 30, 1904 – August 7, 1982) was a professional football player in 1926 and a player-coach in 1927 for the Dayton Triangles of the National Football League. Prior to playing in the NFL, Mahrt played college football at the University of Dayton. He was later inducted into the Dayton Athletics Hall of Fame in 1962.

References
Dayton Flyers Hall of Fame

1904 births
1982 deaths
Dayton Flyers football players
Dayton Triangles coaches
Dayton Triangles players
Players of American football from Ohio